Papa 2 is a film about the notorious interrogation centre, Papa 2. That was run by the BSF in Jammu and Kashmir till 1996.

References

2000 films
Kashmiri-language films
Urdu-language Indian films
Indian documentary films
Documentary films about human rights
Human rights abuses in India
Films set in Jammu and Kashmir
Kashmir conflict in films
2000s Urdu-language films